The Theatres Act 1843 (6 & 7 Vict., c. 68) (also known as the Theatre Regulation Act) is a defunct Act of Parliament in the United Kingdom.  It amended the regime established under the Licensing Act 1737 for the licensing of the theatre in Great Britain, implementing the proposals made by a select committee of the House of Commons in 1832.

Under the Licensing Act 1737 (10 Geo.II, c. 28), the Lord Chamberlain was granted the ability to vet the performance of any new plays: he could prevent any new play, or any modification to an existing play, from being performed for any reason, and was not required to justify his decision.  New plays were required to be submitted to the Lord Chamberlain for a licence before they could be performed, and theatre owners could be prosecuted for staging a play (or part of a play) that had not received prior approval. A licence, once granted, could be also withdrawn.  The Licensing Act 1737 also limited spoken drama to the patent theatres, originally only the Theatre Royal, Drury Lane and Theatre Royal, Covent Garden in London.  The regime was relaxed slightly by the Theatrical Representations Act 1788, under which local magistrates were permitted to license occasional performances for periods of up to 60 days.

The Theatres Act 1843 restricted the powers of the Lord Chamberlain, so that he could only prohibit the performance of plays where he was of the opinion that "it is fitting for the preservation of good manners, decorum or of the public peace so to do".  It also gave additional powers to local authorities to license theatres, breaking the monopoly of the patent theatres and encouraging the development of popular theatrical entertainments, such as saloon theatres attached to public houses and music halls.

The regime established by the 1843 Act was considered by a select committee of the House of Commons in 1866, and two Parliamentary Joint Select committees, in 1909 and then in 1966, and various reforms were proposed, but no changes were implemented until the Act was finally repealed by the Theatres Act 1968.

Jurisdiction
The Act in general was restricted to Great Britain, and more specifically to the vicinities of London, Oxbridge, and royal residences. When George Bernard Shaw's 1909 play The Shewing-Up of Blanco Posnet was refused a licence by the Lord Chamberlain, it was staged in Liverpool and Dublin by the Abbey Theatre players.

See also
 List of Acts of the Parliament of the United Kingdom, 1840–59
 Antitheatricality

References

Citations

Sources
Summary of the report of the Joint Select Committee on Stage Plays (Censorship), 1909
Summary of the report of the Joint Committee on Censorship of the Theatre, 1966–67
Articles on theatre and music hall from the Encyclopædia Britannica Eleventh Edition (1911)

External links
 Hansard indexes at millbanksystems.com: Theatres Regulation Bill and Theatre Regulations Bill

Censorship in the United Kingdom
Theatre in the United Kingdom
United Kingdom Acts of Parliament 1843
Repealed United Kingdom Acts of Parliament
1843 in theatre